Kubjika ( Kubjikā, also known as Vakreshvari, Vakrika, Chinjini) is the primary deity of Kubjikamata, a sect of non-Siddhāntika mantra marga sect. The worship of Kubjika as one of the main aspect of Adishakti was in its peak in 12th century CE. She is still praised in tantric practices that are followed in Kaula tradition.

Etymology 

Kubjikā means "to crook" or "to curve" in Sanskrit. Once lord Navātman/ Shiva embraced his consort Vakrika and before the copulation, she suddenly felt shy and bent her body earning the name, Kubjikā, " the hunchback one" or Vakrika (crooked one).

Worship

Kubjikāmatatantra 

A tantric text named the "Kubjikāmata" or the "Pisumata", dated to the ninth or tenth century, describes the worship of Kubjika. Though she was very famous among the tantric tradition of Kashmir Valley in the past, Kubjika cult was not familiar among the devotees. Though it seemed  that Kubjika was no longer worshipped in the valley either, in mid 1980s, she was discovered in a secret tantric worship that still exists among the Newar people.

Cinjinimatatantra 

According to the Cinjinimatatantra, a text that praises Kubjika, Kaula tradition was taught to four disciples who were sent in the four directions. The disciple sent to the west founded the Western Stream (Pascimāmnaya) of Kaulism, the cult of Navatman and Kubjika. The eastern disciple created Purvāmnaya, the cult of Kuleshvari, while the northern disciple taught Uttarāmnaya, the cult of Kālasangarshini. the Southern tradition was known as Dakshinamnaya, the cult of Kāmēsvari. Nowadays,the southern Srikula sect of Kamesvari and northern Kalikula sect of Kali are still known as Shaktism sects, while the other two (kubjika and Trika) are usually identified as Shaiva sects along with other Kashmiri Shaiva traditions.

References

See more
 Kashmir Shaivism
 Shaktism

Shaktism
Shaivism
Hindu tantric deities
Hindu goddesses